The 2010 Zucchetti Kos Tennis Cup was a professional tennis tournament played on outdoor red clay courts. It was the seventh edition of the tournament which was part of the Tretorn SERIE+ of the 2010 ATP Challenger Tour. It took place in Cordenons, Italy between 26 July and 1 August 2010.

ATP entrants

Seeds

 Rankings are as of July 19, 2010.

Other entrants
The following players received wildcards into the singles main draw:
  Jeremy Jahn
  Daniel Köllerer
  Christophe Rochus
  Adrian Ungur

The following players received entry from the qualifying draw:
  Massimo Bosa
  Andrej Martin
  Gianluca Naso
  Thomas Schoorel

Champions

Singles

 Steve Darcis def.  Daniel Muñoz-de la Nava, 6–2, 6–4

Doubles

 Robin Haase /  Rogier Wassen def.  James Cerretani /  Adil Shamasdin, 7–6(14), 7–5

References
Official website
ITF Search

Zucchetti Kos Tennis Cup
Tretorn SERIE+ tournaments
Clay court tennis tournaments
Internazionali di Tennis del Friuli Venezia Giulia
Zucchetti
August 2010 sports events in Italy